Ichthyophis sikkimensis, the Sikkimese caecilian or Darjeeling caecilian, is a species of caecilian found in India (Sikkim and West Bengal), Nepal and possibly Bhutan. It was described by Edward Harrison Taylor in 1960.

References

sikkimensis
Amphibians described in 1960
Amphibians of India
Amphibians of Nepal
Amphibians of Bhutan